Love the Future is the debut album by the band Chester French, which was released on April 21, 2009 under the record label Star Trak Entertainment.

Background
Love the Future was primarily recorded while the duo attended Harvard University; they recorded most of the songs during class and study breaks at a Harvard recording studio. After recording the album, lead vocalist David-Andrew "D.A." Wallach sent the work to several record labels. The band received recording contract offers from Kanye West's GOOD Music, Jermaine Dupri's Island Def Jam Music Group, Pharrell Williams Star Trak Entertainment and several independent record labels; they ended up signing with Star Trak.

Critical reception

Love the Future received generally mixed reviews from music critics, receiving an aggregated score of 59 out of 100 on Metacritic. Christopher Muther of The Boston Globe felt that the album was "too wise" and "too catchy" to possibly be the debut of Chester French. He compared the songs to that of the band Fountains of Wayne. Heather Phares of Allmusic called the album "much better" when the duo "tones down the hyperactivity and sticks to making songs with ridiculously ingratiating hooks". Wallach's voice was compared to that of Carl Wilson of The Beach Boys.

Track listing
All songs written and composed by David-Andrew "D.A." Wallach and Maxwell Drummey.
 "Introduction" – 1:07
 "C'mon (On My Own)" - 3:22
 "Bebe Buell" – 3:38
 "String Interlude" – 0:57
 "The Jimmy Choos" – 3:15
 "Time to Unwind" – 1:44
 "Fingers" – 4:16
 "Country Interlude" – 5:37
 "Beneath the Veil" – 2:47
 "Neal" – 3:36
 "Not Over You" – 4:24
 "She Loves Everybody" – 3:59
 "Sleep" – 4:13
 "Pleasure Squad" – 3:40 (Amazon.com bonus track)
 "People" - 3:17 (iTunes bonus track)

Personnel

 Jeremiah Alvera – assistant
 Matt Antonowicz – trumpet
 Kevin Arndt – engineer
 Andrew Bergman – bass violin
 Julia Boynton – tap soloist
 Mike Bozzi – mastering
 Mikey Canzonetta – assistant
 Damien Chazelle – drum kit
 Maxwell Drummey – arranger, guitars, basses, keyboards, drums, percussion, synthesizers, marimba, xylophone, timpani, violin, theremin,  programming, background vocals, engineer, producer
 Steve Fiascone – cello
 Scott Fruhan – background vocals
 Jeff Hefler – timpani
 Daniel Holter – engineer
 Mike Judge – bass, background vocals
 Matthew Kan – strings
 Clara Kim – strings

 Laura Krentzman – strings
 Sharan Leventhal – strings
 Marissa Lieata – strings
 Nick Machen – saxophone
 Laura Meyer – tuba
 Amy Ng – strings
 Barry Oosterwaal – trombone
 Neil Pogue – audio mixing
 Robin Ryczek – strings
 Eric Segnitz – strings
 Sopen Shah – strings
 Matt Tahaney – engineer
 Richard Tremarello – French horn
 D.A. Wallach – lead vocals, engineer, producer
 Tyler Wood – piano, mixing
 Adrien Zitoun – strings

Charts

References

External links
 

2009 debut albums
Star Trak Entertainment albums